Dušan Dunjić (Serbian Cyrillic: Душaн Дуњић ; born 29 March 1987 in Kraljevo) is a Serbian football defender.

References

External links
 
 Dušan Dunjić Stats at Utakmica.rs

Living people
1987 births
Sportspeople from Kraljevo
Serbian footballers
FK Napredak Kruševac players
FK Borac Čačak players
FK BSK Borča players
FK Radnički 1923 players
FK Inđija players
FK Bregalnica Štip players
Serbian SuperLiga players
Association football defenders